The American Samoa national rugby league team represents American Samoa at rugby league football and has been participating in international competition since 1988.

Competitions
American Samoa has participated in:

Cabramatta International Nines Rugby League competition/ Sydney: (2008, 2013, 2015)

Pacific Cup (since 1988)
World Sevens (1996, 1997; entered the Qualification Tournament in 2003 and 2004) and the VB Sevens in 2005

All-time record
Below is the head-to-head record for the American Samoa as of 10 May 2020.

Winning team given first

Cabramatta International 9's Rugby League 2015

Plate Champions

Pacific Cup 2004
 Tonga 22-18 American Samoa  (18 October 2004)
 Cook Islands 28-12 American Samoa (20 October 2004)
 American Samoa 62-6 New Caledonia (23 October 2004)

Pacific Cup 1998
 American Samoa 40-34 Cook Islands
 American Samoa 54-12 Tokelau
 Tonga 18-16 American Samoa

Pacific Cup 1992
 Tokelau 26-18 American Samoa
 New Zealand Māoris 26-12 American Samoa 
 American Samoa 94-2 Norfolk Island
 Australia Aborigines 22-10 American Samoa

Pacific Cup 1988
 New Zealand Māoris 42-10 American Samoa 
 Tonga 38-14 American Samoa

Notable players
Pita Godinet
Fui Fui Moi Moi
Ronaldo Mulitalo
Hitro Okesene
Paul Okesene
Joseph Paulo
Junior Paulo
Eddie Pettybourne
Tui Samoa

Sevens results

2005 VB Sevens
 NZ Residents 24-8 American Samoa
 Fiji A 18-16 American Samoa
 American Samoa 32-16 Malta
 Sydney Bulls 28-16 American Samoa

2004 World Sevens Qualifier
 Aboriginals v American Samoa
 North Sydney Bears v American Samoa

2003 World Sevens Qualifier
 American Samoa 28-16 Italy
 American Samoa 6-18 Newtown Jets
 American Samoa 16-22 New Zealand Māori

See also
Players:
Amerika Samoa Rugby League 2015 Squad:

Tinetali Papali'i (C)
Victor Tutuila (VC)
Henry Teofilo
Vinnie Uelese
Henry Godinet
Justin Lemalu
Denny Godinet
Tutuila Tutuila
Enoka Time
Tarrant Mariner
Raymond Ioane
Aaron Teariki
Liam Roebeck
Ben Masoe
Jordan Meads
Tyga Vatuvei

Coach: Paul Roebeck

Assistant Coach: Mikey Misilei Mamae

Strength and Conditioning Coach: Jordan Roebeck

Manager: Leanne Roebeck, Shane Roebeck

Amerika Samoa Rugby League Squad 2016:

Tinetali Papali'i (C)
Victor Tutuila (VC)
Henry Teofilo
Vinnie Uelese
Henry Godinet
Justin Lemalu
Denny Godinet
Tutuila Tutuila
Enoka Time
Tarrant Mariner
Raymond Ioane
Aaron Teariki
Liam Roebeck
Ben Masoe
Jordan Meads
Tyga Vatuvei
Shaun Va'alepu
Wilson Faanoi
Joseph Toetu - Ioane
Jermaine Johansson
Feka Silva
Patrick Masoe

Coach: Paul Roebeck

Assistant Coach: Mikey Misilei Mamae

Strength and Conditioning Coach: Jordan Roebeck

Manager: Leanne Roebeck, Shane Roebeck

Physio: TBA

References

External links

Rug
National rugby league teams